Eric Clarence Puttock (2 March 1900 – 14 December 1969) was an English cricketer.  Puttock's batting style is unknown.  He was born at Billingshurst, Sussex and was educated at Dover College.

Puttock made two first-class appearances for Sussex in the 1921 County Championship against Warwickshire and Essex.  In the match against Warwickshire, Puttock was dismissed for 5 runs in Sussex's first-innings by Freddie Calthorpe, while in their second-innings he was dismissed by Harry Howell for a duck.  Sussex won the match by 80 runs.  Against Essex, he was dismissed for a duck in Sussex's first-innings by Laurie Eastman, while in their second-innings he was promoted to open the batting, scoring 4 runs before he was caught by Colin McIver off the bowling of Johnny Douglas.  Sussex won the match by 6 wickets.

He died at Slinfold, Sussex on 14 December 1969.

References

External links
Eric Puttock at ESPNcricinfo
Eric Puttock at CricketArchive

1900 births
1969 deaths
People from Billingshurst
People educated at Dover College
English cricketers
Sussex cricketers
People from Slinfold